Josefine Lauterbach (22 March 1909 - 4 November 1972) was an Austrian middle-distance runner. She competed in the women's 800 metres at the 1928 Summer Olympics.

References

1903 births
1972 deaths
Athletes (track and field) at the 1928 Summer Olympics
Austrian female middle-distance runners
Olympic athletes of Austria
Place of birth missing